Lanfranchi's Memorial Discotheque is a 2010 documentary and the first film directed and produced by Richard Baron. The film chronicles the last sixty days of the eponymous artist-run initiative which ran from 2002–2007 in Sydney, Australia.

The film premiered at Popcorn Taxi, was nominated for an Independent Spirit award at the Inside Film Awards, won the Director's Choice Award at the Sydney Underground Film Festival and Best Documentary at the Melbourne Underground Film Festival.

One year after its premiere screening, the film was digitally distributed as a free, legal BitTorrent download via VODO.

External links 
 
 

Australian documentary films
2010 films
2010 documentary films
Documentary films about the visual arts
Films shot in Sydney
Culture of Sydney
2010s English-language films